Mujeres (lit: "Women") is a Spanish dramedy television series created and directed by Dunia Ayaso and Félix Sabroso. It originally aired from September to December 2006 on La 2.

Plot 
The plot delves into the personal stories of three generations of women living in a Madrilenian lower-middle class neighborhood, inspired in Hortaleza.

Cast 
  as Irene, a widowed woman in her 40s, responsible for the family business, a bakery.
 Teresa Lozano as Palmira, the grand mother, with incipient senile dementia.
 Carmen Ruiz as Julia, the eldest daughter returning to the family home after going bust.
 Inma Cuevas as Magda, a hung-up teenager.
 Bart Santana as Raúl.
 Gracia Olayo as Susana.
 Antonio Gil Martínez as Manuel.
 Marylin Torres as Belinda.
  as Bernardo / Gabriel.
 Víctor Clavijo as Nicolás.
  as Jamie.
 Malena Gutiérrez as Mariana.
  as Willy.

Production and release 
Produced by El Deseo together with Mediapro, it is the first and, as of 2018, the only television series produced by Pedro Almodóvar's production company. Slated to air on the TVE's flagship channel La 1, it eventually premiered on La 2 on 18 September 2006, a year after it was filmed. The series consisted of a single-season featuring 13 episodes, with a running time ranging from 63 to 70 minutes. The series broadcasting run ended on 14 December 2006.

Mujeres doubled the average prime time viewer ratings in La 2, received excellent critical reception, and the cast members earned several awards for their performances. RAI – Radiotelevisione italiana purchased the broadcasting rights for Italy.

Awards and nominations

References 
Citations

Bibliography
 

La 2 (Spanish TV channel) network series
2006 Spanish television series debuts
2006 Spanish television series endings
2000s Spanish comedy television series
2000s Spanish drama television series
Television shows set in Madrid
2000s comedy-drama television series
Spanish comedy-drama television series